Šuoššjávri Chapel is a chapel of the Church of Norway in Karasjok Municipality in Troms og Finnmark county, Norway. It is located in the village of Šuoššjávri. It is an annex chapel for the Karasjok parish which is part of the Indre Finnmark prosti (deanery) in the Diocese of Nord-Hålogaland. The wooden church was built in a rectangular style in 1968 by the architect Ernst Nilsen. The church seats about 75 people and serves the rural western part of the municipality.

See also
List of churches in Nord-Hålogaland

References

Karasjok
Churches in Finnmark
Wooden churches in Norway
20th-century Church of Norway church buildings
Churches completed in 1968
1968 establishments in Norway
Rectangular churches in Norway